Tia Lee Yu-fen is a C-Pop singer, film, television actress who on December 2022 broke the record for the fastest Chinese music video to reach 100 million views on YouTube, in 20 days. The Taiwanese celebrity is a former member of the girl band Dream Girls.  

Tia Lee has modelled at major fashion shows and appeared on the covers of fashion magazines ELLE, Marie Claire, MILK, GQ, FHM, Girlfriend (女友), Urban Beauty (都市丽人), Hua Liu (华流), and FG Beauty (FG 美妆), and Rollercoaster. She shares beauty and fashion tips through a number of Vogue's social media channels.

Lee is an advocate of women empowerment's. She established the #EmpowerHer movement to raise awareness and support for women-centric charitable organisations.

Education
Lee graduated from Dao Jiang Senior High School of Nursing & Home Economics majoring in cosmetology.

Music career

In 2010, Lee, Emily Song and Puff Kuo formed the Dream Girls. In 2011, Dream Girls released their debut EP "Beautiful Dreams", and Li Yufen also starred in the short musical movie Dying For Love.

In 2016, Lee joined Sony Music and released the music single Not Good Enough. In July she participated in the charity song Give It A Home.

In 2018, Lee  released her solo single We Should Have (早應該). In 2019, Lee endorsed the Xianxia MMO game 美人刹 (aka “Beauty Brake” or “Game of Immortal Legend”)

In December 2022, Lee's MV single Goodbye Princess, produced by American music producer Swizz Beatz, was released on YouTube, shortly afterwards setting the record for the fastest Chinese pop music video to reach 100 million views on YouTube, doing so within a month.

Acting career 
Lee made her acting debut in the 2006 television series New Stars in the Night playing a small role. In 2012, she starred in the romantic comedy Miss Rose (最完美的女孩). In 2014, she starred in the drama series Fall in Love with Me opposite Aaron Yan.

In 2016, Lee  starred in the thriller The Perfect Girl (最完美的女孩) with Ray Chang and the thriller Please Keep Away (请勿靠近). In 2015, she starred in the sci-fi drama Future Mr. Right (來自未來的史密特) and in 2016 the thriller The Perfect Girl (最完美的女孩). In 2019, the romantic, musical road movie One Headlight (絕世情歌) starring Bor-Jeng Chen was released. In this movie, Lee played the heroine Fei, an optimistic free spirit.

In November 2022, Lee began to release a series of 6 short animated videos entitled "Goodbye Princess", each 30 seconds long, in advance of her new single "Goodbye Princess", to be released the following month. Directed by Tang Yat-Sing, illustrated by Mandy Mackenzie Ng, and with music composed by Zhu Yun, the Goodbye Princess animation series was based on Lee's own thoughts and encounters when she began her showbiz career. Each episode borrowed a "princess" character from the fairy tale world.

Fashion 
Lee has modelled for the covers of art, culture, lifestyle and fashion magazines including Vogue, Rollacoaster, Marie Clare, and Elle, and has been at a number of international fashion shows. She shares beauty and fashion tips through Vogue’s social media channels.

In November 2022, Lee featured as the cover of Vogue Hong Kong’s digital edition wearing Gucci x Adidas collaboration together with an interview about her experience in the industry. In December 2022, she appeared in a Burberry outfit on the global cover of Rollacoaster, a UK fashion and music magazine.

Lee has been invited to fashion and brand events by Louis Vuitton and Swarovski.

Charitable activities 
Lee established the #EmpowerHer campaign to raise awareness and support for women-centric charitable organisations. The #EmpowerHer project has donated money raised to women empowerment charities including Women in Music in USA, Beats by Girlz in Europe, Africa and Americas, Teen’s Key in Hong Kong and Daughters of Tomorrow Singapore as initial recipients.  Each YouTube view of the ‘Goodbye Princess’ Music Video raises money for women empowerment charities worldwide as part of the #EmpowerHer campaign.

Since the #EmpowerHer campaign was launched TikTokers created a viral dance for the ‘Goodbye Princess’ song with the #EmpowerHerDance challenge which fueled the campaign's international ambitions with Australian Hannah Balanay, and continued to spread to TikTokers and dancers from different regions and nations. As a result, female duo DJ Olivia and Miriam Nervo did a remix of the ‘Goodbye Princess’ song and launched the #EmpowerHerMusic campaign in support of the #EmpowerHer women empowerment initiative.

Filmography

Television series

Feature film

Short film

Animation

Music video appearances

Discography
With Dream Girls

Studio albums

Singles

References

External links

 
 

1985 births
Musicians from Taipei
Taiwanese television actresses
Living people
Taiwanese film actresses
21st-century Taiwanese actresses
21st-century Taiwanese singers
21st-century Taiwanese women singers